Charlie Reed may refer to:

 Chick Reed (1912–1964), English professional footballer
 Charlie Reed (journalist), American journalist

See also
Charlie Reid (disambiguation)
Charles Reed (disambiguation)